Samtgemeinde Hankensbüttel is a Samtgemeinde in the district of Gifhorn, in Lower Saxony, Germany. It is situated approximately 30 km north-east of Gifhorn and 20 km south of Uelzen. 9.739 citizens are living in the Samtgemeinde Hankensbüttel.

Politics

Samtgemeinde council
 CDU - 13 Seats
 SPD - 4 Seats
 Green Party - 3 Seats
 FDP - 1 Seat
 Independent - 3 Seats

Structure of Samtgemeinde Hankensbüttel
Samtgemeinde Hankensbüttel was founded with five member municipalities. The administration of the Samtgemeinde is situated in the central village of Hankensbüttel.

Economy
The Samtgemeinde Hankensbüttel is a rural area with many forests and agriculture. Also, there are some areas of heathland that make part of the Lüneburger Heide. The biggest employer of the region is Volkswagen at Wolfsburg, that is 50 km away from Hankensbüttel. Furthermore, there is some tourism in the region (see below).

Tourism
There are some tourist sights in the Samtgemeinde Hankensbüttel: Directly at Hankensbüttel is the Otter-Zentrum (otter-centre), a zoo of local animals, and a monastery built in the time from 1345 to 1350. At Oerrel, there is a museum of hunting. Around the villages, there are forests and some areas of heathland which make part of the national park Südheide. The streets and the flat countryside are ideal for bicycle tours.

References

External links

  

Samtgemeinden in Lower Saxony
Hankensbuttel, Samtgemeinde